Dumitru Mitu (born 13 February 1975) is a Romanian former footballer who played as a left winger or striker.

Early life
Mitu was born in Bucharest, but spent his childhood years in the nearby village of Dobroieşti. His father worked at the village bar, while his mother was a kiosk saleswoman. At age six and a half he started to play as a junior for Metalul (Faur) București, then a second division club, eventually reaching the first team. In 1992, aged 17, he signed for Steaua's junior squad.

Senior career
In 1992 Mitu started his senior football career in his hometown team of Faur București, a little later playing for lesser-known clubs like Farul Constanţa, FC Braşov and UTA Arad, before moving to NK Osijek during season 1996–1997. He was a big star at NK Osijek. After 159 appearances and 26 goals for NK Osijek and seven years spent at club, he transferred to Dinamo, where he won four national championships. Then he was sold to Greek Panathinaikos and he played there 6 games mainly in UEFA Champions League.

Shortly after UEFA Champions League champaign at Panathinaikos FC he returned to Croatia with HNK Rijeka. After one season he returns to Dinamo Zagreb where he won First League title. Then he returns to homeland at CFR Cluj where he played 12 games with one goal but in second season leadership of CFR Cluj decided to cancel the Mitu's contract. The player came at CFR Cluj from Dinamo Zagreb and had a contract of 70,000 dollars per season. He scored just one goal for CFR Cluj in second part of last season. In this season, Mitu did not play any minute at CFR Cluj, he being sent to train and to play at second team, Unirea Dej, after the leadership heard that he spent more night in a night club. "It was the decision of the leadership, because I was decided to give him another chance. But he disappointed me with his declarations after the match with Dinamo, when he told to the press that I prefer to send on the field the foreign players of CFR Cluj", said coach Cristiano Bergodi. Because CFR Cluj cancelled the contract of Dumitru Mitu, the player has become free player. The officials of Jiul said that are interested of him, to bring Mitu at Petroşani, from winter. The player said that nobody told him that, but we would come from winter at Jiul.

The striker who cancelled his contract with CFR is training together with the team from Arad. "Mitu asked me if he can train with us. I let him because I know what it means to be player and to have no team where to train", said Lacatus, who did not change his mind about the transfer of Mitu at UTA Arad. "I prefer to bring younger players, till 25–26 years old, but with some experience in Liga 1", said the coach of UTA Arad.

Since the 2006–2007 season he was played for Chinese Super League with the Chinese football club Qingdao Zhongneng. Since then he was Free agent. Mitu is still playing football in a lower third division league in Romania.

Mitu is a dual citizen of Romania and Croatia. He gained Croatian citizenship in 2003.

Honours

Club
NK Osijek
Croatian Cup: 1998–99

Dinamo Zagreb
Croatian League: 2002–03, 2005–06
Croatian Cup: 2003–04
Croatian Supercup: 2002, 2003

HNK Rijeka
Croatian Cup: 2004–05

References

External links

1975 births
Living people
Footballers from Bucharest
Romanian footballers
NK Osijek players
GNK Dinamo Zagreb players
HNK Rijeka players
FC Brașov (1936) players
FCV Farul Constanța players
CFR Cluj players
FC Unirea Dej players
FC UTA Arad players
Panathinaikos F.C. players
CS Șoimii Pâncota players
Romanian expatriate footballers
Expatriate footballers in Croatia
Romanian expatriate sportspeople in Croatia
Expatriate footballers in Greece
Romanian expatriate sportspeople in Greece
Expatriate footballers in China
Romanian expatriate sportspeople in China
Qingdao Hainiu F.C. (1990) players
Changchun Yatai F.C. players
Chinese Super League players
Super League Greece players
Croatian Football League players
Liga I players
Liga II players
Association football forwards
Croatian people of Romanian descent